Harry Johnson (born 1903, date of death unknown) was an English wrestler.

Wrestling
He competed in the welterweight category at the 1930 British Empire Games for England.

Personal life
He was a turner at the time of the 1930 Games and lived in 31 Kambala Road, Battersea.

References

1903 births
Year of death missing
Commonwealth Games silver medallists for England
Commonwealth Games medallists in wrestling
Wrestlers at the 1930 British Empire Games
Medallists at the 1930 British Empire Games